Lionel White (1948–1998) was an American funk and punk rock musician who recorded music under the name Snuky Tate. He is best remembered for his novelty single He's the Groove (1980) about Pope John Paul II.

Biography
Lionel White was born in Wilmington, Delaware, United States in 1948 and studied painting at the University of Delaware. One of his influences was Jimi Hendrix. In the early 1970s he moved to San Francisco where he adapted a comedy character named Snuky Tate, which he performed on stage during punk concerts. In 1979 he was part of the San Francisco art rock band The Alterboys, in which Richard Edson was a member too. The same year White recorded his first musical single, "Who Cares?", and released it on Blackmouth Music under the name Snuky Tate. At the start of the 1980s he moved to New York and recorded his second musical single, "He's the Groove", which was a funky pop single about Pope John Paul II. In 1982 he released the album Babylon Under Pressure on Christ Stein's Animal Records. Snuky Tate's records were released on ZE Records. He died in 1998.

He identified as being homosexual.

References

External links
 Discogs article.

American novelty song performers
American punk rock musicians
American funk musicians
1948 births
1998 deaths
American comedy musicians
American LGBT musicians
People from Wilmington, Delaware
20th-century American comedians
20th-century American LGBT people